Bannari Amman Institute of Technology (Autonomous) is an engineering college located in Sathyamangalam, Erode, Tamil Nadu, India. It was founded by the Bannari Amman Group in 1996 and is affiliated to Anna University. The institute offers 21 undergraduate, 10 postgraduate programmes in Engineering, Technology and Management studies. All the departments of Engineering and Technology are recognized by Anna University, Chennai to offer Ph.D. programmes.

Programmes offered

Undergraduate Programmes 

Bachelor of Engineering in 

 Agriculture Engineering
 Automobile Engineering
 Biomedical Engineering
 Civil Engineering
 Computer Science & Engineering
 Electrical & Electronics Engineering
 Electronics & Instrumentation Engineering
 Information Science & Engineering
 Mechanical Engineering
 Mechatronics

Bachelor of Technology in 
 Artificial Intelligence and Data Science
Artificial Intelligence and Machine Learning
Biotechnology
 Computer Science and Business Systems
 Computer Technology
 Food Technology
 Fashion Technology
 Information Technology
 Textile Technology

Postgraduate Programmes 
Master of Engineering in

 Communication Systems
 Computer Science & Engineering
 Industrial Automation & Robotics
 Industrial Safety & Engineering
 Software Engineering
Structural Engineering
Master of Technology in
 Biotechnology
 
Master of Business Administration

Ph.D. / M.S. (by research) Programmes 

Aeronautical Engineering
Agriculture Engineering
Automobile Engineering
Biotechnology
Civil Engineering
Computer Science & Engineering
Electrical & Electronics Engineering
Electronics & Communication Engineering
Electronics & Instrumentation Engineering
Fashion Technology
Information Technology
Mechanical Engineering
Mechatronics
Textile Technology
Physics 
Chemistry

Admissions 
Admissions is through Tamil Nadu Engineering Admission (TNEA) ranking based on 12th standard exam results facilitated by Directorate Of Technical Education (DoTE). ME/M.Tech admissions are based on ranking in TANCET examination conducted by Anna University. The Counselling code of the Institution is 2702.Management seats are available after the final round of counselling.

Infrastructure 
Library

The five-storeyed, air-conditioned and computerized library is well-stacked. 83000 Volumes, 400 National and International Journals, 6500 CD-ROMs, a Digital Library with 6000 e-journals, 274 NPTEL and 166 NITTTR video courses are part of the resources. BIT is an Institutional member of the British Council Library, Chennai, DELNET, New Delhi and INDEST Consortium, New Delhi.

Hostels

The institute has four hostels for male students and five hostels for female students. All hostels are fully furnished and single, double and four occupancy rooms are available

Hostel Details:

Gents Hostel  - 3931 inmates

Ladies Hostel - 2191 inmates

 Other Facilities in Hostel: Dining Halls, Mini Cine Theatres, Indoor Courts for Shuttle & Table Tennis.

Sports

All necessary sports facilities with state-of-the-art technology are available in the campus. The Existing sports facilities for students includes 400 m standard athletic track with 8 lanes including a Long Jump & Triple Jump Pit, Sectors for Shot-put, Discus & Javelin throws,

In additional, it has also a standard bed for High jump and Pole vault events, a football field and two kho- kho courts, a Hockey field with kerb, 65 m radius cricket field with two net practice pitches & one portable nets, two Volleyball courts, two Ball Badminton Courts, 

one Handball Courts and two Kabaddi Courts. Total area of the BIT Play Field is 5,74,580 sq. ft.

Auditorium

A fully air-conditioned indoor Vedanayagam auditorium with a capacity to seat 750 students.

Town Hall

A fully air-conditioned main auditorium with a capacity to seat 2500 students.

Rankings

BIT was ranked 96 among private engineering colleges in India by Outlook India in 2022.

References

External links 
 

Engineering colleges in Tamil Nadu
Colleges affiliated to Anna University
Universities and colleges in Erode district
Educational institutions established in 1996
1996 establishments in Tamil Nadu